Nicola Falasco (born 5 October 1993) is an Italian footballer who plays as a left back for Ascoli.

Career

Early career
Born in Piove di Sacco, Veneto, Falasco started his career at Lombard club Brescia. In summer 2012 he was signed by FeralpiSalò in a temporary deal. On 1 August 2013 Falasco, Ferrari and Gerevini were signed by Viareggio. On 4 August 2014 Falasco was signed by Pistoiese in another temporary deal. On 25 June 2015 Falasco renewed his contract with Pistoiese.

Roma and Cesena
On 1 February 2016, Falasco was signed by Roma for €180,000 fee (plus €20,000 to agent(s)) in a -year contract. He immediately left for Serie B club Cesena in a half-season temporary deal, with an option to purchase.

Having made six appearances including four starts for Cesena, he rejoined the club on a season-long loan on 5 July 2016, again with an option to purchase for Cesena as well as buy-back clause for Roma.

Avellino
On 29 June 2017, Falasco was signed by Avellino on loan, with an obligation to sign outright at the end of season.

Perugia
On 9 August 2018, he signed a three-year contract with Serie B club Perugia.

Pordenone
Falasco signed for Pordenone from Perugia for 180k on the 9 September 2020.

Ascoli
On 13 January 2022, he moved to Ascoli on a 1.5-year contract.

References

External links
 
 AIC profile (data by football.it) 

Living people
1993 births
Italian footballers
Association football midfielders
Sportspeople from the Province of Padua
Footballers from Veneto
Brescia Calcio players
FeralpiSalò players
F.C. Esperia Viareggio players
U.S. Pistoiese 1921 players
A.S. Roma players
A.C. Cesena players
U.S. Avellino 1912 players
A.C. Perugia Calcio players
Pordenone Calcio players
Ascoli Calcio 1898 F.C. players
Serie B players
Serie C players